The 1971 NCAA men's volleyball tournament was the second annual tournament to determine the national champion of NCAA men's college volleyball. The tournament was played at Pauley Pavilion in Los Angeles, California. Like the previous year, the format of this championship consisted of a preliminary, four-team round robin to determine seeding for a subsequent single-elimination tournament.

UCLA defeated UC Santa Barbara, 3–0 (15–6, 17–15, 17–15), in the championship match to win their second consecutive national title. UCLA's Kirk Kilgour and UC Santa Barbara's Tim Bonynge were named the Most Outstanding Players of the tournament.

Qualification
Until the creation of the NCAA Men's Division III Volleyball Championship in 2012, there was only a single national championship for men's volleyball. As such, all NCAA men's volleyball programs (whether from the University Division, or the College Division) were eligible. A total of 4 teams were invited to contest this championship.

Round robin

|}

Bracket 
Site: Pauley Pavilion, Los Angeles, California

All tournament team 
Kirk Kilgour, UCLA (Co-Most Outstanding Player)
Tom Bonynge, UC Santa Barbara (Co-Most Outstanding Player)
Ed Machado, UCLA
Dale Flannery, Ball State
Jorn Oulie, UC Santa Barbara
Larry Griebenow, UCLA

See also 
 NCAA Men's National Collegiate Volleyball Championship

References

1971
NCAA Men's Volleyball Championship
NCAA Men's Volleyball Championship
Volleyball in California
1971 in sports in California
May 1971 sports events in the United States